"She Keeps Me Up" is a song recorded by the Canadian rock band Nickelback. It was released on February 17, 2015 in North America, as the fifth overall single from their 2014 album, No Fixed Address. In an interview with his brother Mike Kroeger for The Vancouver Sun, while noting many assume the lyrics are merely sexual innuendo, he freely admits the song is actually about cocaine use. The additional vocalist on the song is Ali Tamposi.

Music video
The music video, directed by Nigel Dick, shows two young ladies entering a secret pub at night. When they enter, they see people dancing, a bar man juggling cups, the band wearing suits and sunglasses and a man dressed in funking clothing dancing on a disco floor. At the end the ladies leave the pub and are holding each other's hands in the day. Porscha Coleman was doing the backing vocals in the video, instead of Tamposi.

Chart performance

References

2014 songs
2015 singles
Nickelback songs
Republic Records singles
Dance-rock songs
Songs about cocaine
Songs written by Chad Kroeger
Songs written by Jacob Kasher
Songs written by Josh Ramsay